Railway electrification in Scotland has proceeded in a different fashion than the rest of the UK especially in the 21st Century. There is political commitment to a substantial rolling programme of railway electrification from the Scottish government where transport is devolved. Transport Scotland and others have said "In Scotland, decarbonisation is spelt E-L-E-C-T-R-I-F-Y". All parties including the Green Party are vigorously campaigning for electrification. As of January 2022, there is 2776 kilometres of track in Scotland, and 711 kilometres are electrified representing 25.3%. To meet these needs, the plan is to electrify on average 130 single track kilometres (STK) per year until 2035.

Twentieth century history
Much of the Glasgow suburban network was electrified by 1960 with the introduction of blue trains. Electrified power lines began to appear at Glasgow Central station high-level platforms at the start of 1960s under British Railways. Firstly came 6.25 kV AC overhead power lines from the Cathcart Circle Line electrification scheme, which started on 29 May 1962. The Ayr, Ardrossan and Largs lines were completed in 1986-1987. This was followed by the 25 kV AC overhead-power-lines electrification of the Glasgow and Paisley Joint Railway and the Inverclyde Line to Gourock and Wemyss Bay, completed in 1967. The WCML electrification scheme from Weaver Junction to Glasgow was discussed in 1968 and a report issued, and was completed in 1974 with squadron service starting on 6 May 1974.  Progressive upgrading of the Cathcart Circle to 25 kV AC supply was started in 1974 and the whole of the route was upgraded later. The East Coast Main Line (ECML) was electrified in stages and reached Edinburgh in 1991. The branch to North Berwick was done at the same time. In this timeframe the Glasgow–Edinburgh via Carstairs line was also electrified although it had been examined in 1978.

Twenty first century history
In Scotland, where transport is devolved to the Scottish Government, Transport Scotland has extended and continues to expand electrification. The Airdrie–Bathgate rail link and the Whifflet Line were completed in November 2014. This is part of a larger plan that has seen many major routes in central Scotland electrified, including the main – route. They have pursued electrification with multiple schemes in the Central Belt. All these have been 25kVAC, as in England and Wales. In September 2019, Transport for Scotland announced the goal of having Scottish transport net carbon neutral by the year 2035. This would be achieved by a rolling programme of electrification; where that is not feasible, using battery and other emerging technology such as hydrogen. Electrification was completed by 2019; it was carried out under the rolling programme of electrification, rather than as part of the EGIP programme. EGIP was an initiative funded by Transport Scotland on behalf of the Scottish Government to increase capacity on the main railway line between Edinburgh and Glasgow, with new, longer electric trains running by 2017 and scheduled for full completion in 2019. It was expected to cost £742 million and delivered by Network Rail.

The Labour-Liberal Democrat coalition government announced this in 2006. It was completed in October 2021 with the Glasgow Queen Street station modernisation. On 28 July 2020, Scottish Transport Secretary Michael Matheson announced plans to phase out fossil fuel use on the railway network by 2035. The plan would see most lines electrified, but suggests that intermittent electrification in difficult places may be implemented. Alternative traction will be implemented rather than electrification for some lightly-used lines. These are the Far North Line, Kyle of Lochalsh Line, West Highland Line, and the southern portion of the Stranraer Line. Other Scottish political parties including the Green Party support a  rolling programme and indeed want it accelerating. Transport Scotland has also published a list prioritising the projects and divided them into the categories of 1) in delivery, 2) in development, 3) under active consideration. On 1 July 2022, Network Rail confirmed investment and planning for the electrical grid feeders to power the schemes. 
Scotland electrification is using innovation to achieve its aims. Resiliency of the power supply is considered key and discontinuous electrification with Battery EMUs being used to achieve intermediate goals. 

The HLOS- High Level Output Statement for Scotland for CP7 reaffirmed commitment to a rolling programme of electrification and other upgrades.

Individual schemes
 Whifflet and Coatbridge line was to be done before 2014 games
  Edinburgh to Glasgow Improvement Programme
 Levenmouth rail link
 Airdrie-Bathgate Rail Link
 Larkfield to East Kilbride
 Fife route - started June 2022.

East Kilbride scheme
In early 2021 a start was made on the electrification scheme to East Kilbride.

Fife Circle Line
In June 2022 work commenced on the partial electrification of the Fife Circle Line.  This will involve extending the existing Edinburgh area electrification to Dalmeny, and an isolated area of electrification between Kirkcaldy, Lochgelly and Ladybank.  This will allow the Fife Circle services to be operated by battery electric multiple units whilst minimising capital expenditure on infrastructure, in particular avoiding the major expense of electrifying the Forth Bridge.  Complete electrification would be possible at some future date.  The partial electrification is due to be completed in December 2025.
Timeline as follows:
 June 2022 Haymarket to Dalmeny electrification work started
 December 2024 Haymarket to Dalmeny electrification work complete
 December 2025 Partial electrification of Fife Circle Line

Under active consideration
Future phases of Decarbonisation Action Plan
 Aberdeen to Central Belt Electrification
 Aberdeen to Inverness Electrification
 Dunblane-Hilton route clearance for future electrification
 Electrification - Ayrshire and Glasgow & South West
 Electrification - Dunfermline Queen Margaret to Longannet
 Electrification - Fife Circle
 Electrification - Fife to Perth and Dundee
 Highland Mainline Electrification
 New and enhanced grid feeders to power all the schemes

Maps

See also
 Airdrie–Bathgate rail link
 Campaign to Electrify Britain's Railway
 Glasgow Airport Rail Link
 History of rail transport in Great Britain 1995 to date
 List of proposed railway electrification routes in Great Britain
 21st-century modernisation of the Great Western Main Line
 Midland Main Line railway upgrade
 North West England electrification schemes
 Overhead line
 Transpennine Route Upgrade
 Transport in Scotland
 West Coast Main Line route modernisation

References

Further reading
 
 
 
 
 
 

Rail infrastructure in Scotland
Electrification
Railway upgrades in the United Kingdom